The 1954 Divizia B was the 15th season of the second tier of the Romanian football league system.

The format has been changed to three series, each of them having 13 teams. At the end of the season the winners of the series promoted to Divizia A and last two places from each series relegated to District Championship. This was the fifth season played in the spring-autumn system, a system imposed by the new leadership of the country which were in close ties with the Soviet Union.

Team changes

To Divizia B
Promoted from District Championship
 Constructorul Arad
 Constructorul Craiova
 Dinamo 6 București
 Dinamo Galați
 Flamura Roșie Buhuși
 Flamura Roșie Cluj
 Locomotiva Constanța
 Locomotiva Pașcani
 Metalul Ploiești
 Metalul Tractorul
 Spartac Burdujeni
 Spartac Focșani

Relegated from Divizia A
 —

From Divizia B
Relegated to District Championship
 Șantierul Constanța

Promoted to Divizia A
 Flacăra Ploiești 
 Metalul Hunedoara
 Metalul Câmpia Turzii

Excluded teams 
CA Câmpulung Moldovenesc, CA Cluj and CA Craiova were excluded from the championship. The army teams (CA) were abolished in the summer of 1953, except for CCA București.

Enrolled teams 
Voința București, which was in fact, the Romania national youth team, was enrolled directly in the second division.

Renamed teams 
Flamura Roșie Pitești was renamed as Flacăra Pitești.

Libertatea Sibiu was renamed as Progresul Sibiu.

Other teams 
Dinamo Turnu Măgurele was moved from Turnu Măgurele to Bârlad and renamed as Dinamo Bârlad.

League tables

Serie I

Serie II

Serie III

See also 

 1954 Divizia A

References

Liga II seasons
Romania
Romania
2
2